is a Japanese handball player for Wakunaga Leolic and the Japanese national team.

He participated at the 2017 World Men's Handball Championship.

References

1983 births
Living people
Japanese male handball players